An omphalos is a religious stone artefact. In Ancient Greek, the word  means "navel". Among the Ancient Greeks, it was a widespread belief that Delphi was the center of the world. According to the myths regarding the founding of the Delphic Oracle, Zeus, in his attempt to locate the center of the earth, launched two eagles from the two ends of the world, and the eagles, starting simultaneously and flying at equal speed, crossed their paths above the area of Delphi, and so was the place where Zeus placed the stone. 

Omphalos is also the name of the stone given to Cronus. In the ancient world of the Mediterranean, it was a powerful religious symbol. 

Omphalos Syndrome refers to the belief that a place of geopolitical power and currency is the most important place in the world.

Delphi 

Most accounts locate the Delphi omphalos in the adyton (sacred part of the temple) near the Pythia (oracle). The stone sculpture itself (which may be a copy), has a carving of a knotted net covering its surface, and a hollow center, widening towards the base. The omphalos represents the stone which Rhea wrapped in swaddling clothes, pretending it was Zeus, in order to deceive Cronus. (Cronus was the father who swallowed his children so as to prevent them from usurping him as he had deposed his own father, Uranus).

Omphalos stones were believed to allow direct communication with the gods. Holland (1933) suggested that the stone was hollow to allow intoxicating vapours breathed by the Oracle to channel through it. Erwin Rohde wrote that the Python at Delphi was an earth spirit, who was conquered by Apollo and buried under the Omphalos. However, understanding of the use of the omphalos is uncertain due to destruction of the site by Theodosius I and Arcadius in the 4th century CE.

Jerusalem

Judaism
The Foundation Stone at the peak of the Temple Mount is considered in traditional Jewish sources to be the place from which the creation of the world began, with several further major biblical events connected to it. Jewish tradition holds that God revealed Himself to His people through the Ark of the Covenant in the Temple in Jerusalem, which rested on the Foundation Stone marking the centre of the world.

Christianity

The omphalos at the Church of the Holy Sepulchre, Jerusalem, represents, in medieval Christian tradition, the navel of the world  (the spiritual and cosmological centre of the world). The omphalos stone has a collection box chained next to it (see picture).

Islam
The Dome of the Rock on the Aqsa Masjid/Haram ash-Sharif might have served the same purpose in Islam.

Art 

Omphalos is a public art sculpture by Dimitri Hadzi formerly located in the Harvard Square, Cambridge, Massachusetts under the Arts on the Line program. , the sculpture has been deinstalled; it will be relocated to Rockport, Massachusetts.

Omfalos is a concrete and rock sculpture by the conceptual artist Lars Vilks, previously standing in the Kullaberg natural reserve, Skåne County, Sweden. As of 2001, the sculpture belongs to the collections of Moderna Museet in Stockholm, Sweden.

Literature 

In literature, the word omphalos has held various meanings but usually refers to the stone at Delphi. Authors who have used the term include: Homer, Pausanias, D.H. Lawrence, James Joyce, Jacques Derrida, Ted Chiang and Sandy Hingston. For example, Joyce uses the term in the novel, Ulysses:

In Ted Chiang's short story "Omphalos" (2019), the protagonist is forced to question her belief about where the center of the world is located.

See also 
 Axis mundi
 Benben stone
 Black Stone 
Kaaba 
 Lapis Niger
Mexico,  "the navel of the moon" in Nahuatl
 Lia Fáil
 Lingam
 Stone of Scone
 Umbilicus urbis Romae

Sources

References

External links 
 
 

Classical oracles
Phallic symbols
Stones
Yonic symbols